Bathyarca is a genus of bivalves belonging to the family Arcidae.

The genus has cosmopolitan distribution.

Species

Species:

Bathyarca adelaideana 
Bathyarca anaclima 
Bathyarca bellatula 
Bathyarca pectunculoides

References

Arcidae
Bivalve genera